H07 is an important Ukraine national highway (H-highway) in Kyiv, Chernihiv, and Sumy Oblasts, Ukraine, running mainly west-east, and connecting Kyiv (if switching to another highway at Brovary) with Yunakivka in a more or less straight line. It begins in Brovary at Highway M01/Highway E95, and passes through Krasylivka, Hoholiv, Rusaniv, Peremoha, Nova Basan, Novyi Bykiv, Pohreby, Rudivka, Pryluky, Okhyrky, Sribne, Kharkove, Lavirkove, Romny, Korovyntsi, Nedryhailiv, Vylshana, Komyshanka, Shtepivka, Sula, Sad, Sumy, Stetskivka, Pysarivka, and Yunakivka, before ending at the Russian border. The road then continues as the R200 to Kursk.

Accessibility
Marshrutkas from Kyiv to Sumy actually prefer to first travel by means of Highway M03, then turning onto the P60 at Pyryatyn, and only then turning onto Highway H07 in Romny. The same stands for marshrutkas from Sumy to Kyiv. The reason is that on this route there are more rest stops for marshrutkas (in Boryspil, Pyryatyn, Lokhvytsya, Romny, and Nedryhailiv) than on Highway H07 (there are none before Romny except in Pryluky, but that poses a minor detour).

Main route

Main route and intersections with other highways in Ukraine:

See also

 Roads in Ukraine
 Ukraine State Highways

References 

Roads in Kyiv Oblast
Roads in Chernihiv Oblast
Roads in Sumy Oblast